Metea is a trade union representing metal and textile workers in Belgium.

The union was founded on 12 December 2009, when the Christian Union of Belgian Metalworkers merged with the Christian Union of Belgian Textile and Clothing Workers.  Like both its predecessors, it affiliated to the Confederation of Christian Trade Unions.  At its founding, it had 250,000 members.

Presidents
2009: Marc De Wilde
2018: William Van Erdeghem

External links

References

Christian trade unions
Metal trade unions
Textile and clothing trade unions
Trade unions established in 2009
Trade unions in Belgium